The Suzuki T500, variously known as the Suzuki T500/Five, Suzuki Charger, Suzuki Cobra and the Suzuki Titan during its model life, is a , two-stroke, twin-cylinder motorcycle produced by the Japanese Suzuki company between 1968 and 1975. The model was developed as a larger version of the Suzuki T20 which was intended to compete with the large-capacity British twins in the American market. When introduced it was Suzuki's largest displacement machine. Overengineering of the engine led to the bike gaining a reputation for reliability, and being virtually bulletproof. A total of over 100,000 units were sold during the model's production.

History

There was a generally held view in the 1960s that an air cooled two stroke larger than 350cc was impractical to build as it would overheat, would be unmanageable to ride due to its narrow power band and use too much fuel. Building on the success of the T20, Suzuki built a 500 that dispelled this theory. The original model, the T500/Five, was advertised as the sports cycle that couldn't be made.

The T500/Five, which was introduced in 1968, suffered handling problems. An updated Mk II version was soon launched, which had the swinging arm extended to improve the handling. To differentiate the revised version from the original, the model was renamed the Cobra which was objected to by Ford/Shelby who manufactured the Shelby Cobra. A name change to Charger was objected to by Dodge, who were making a car called the Charger. The name was again changed to Titan. In the UK motorcycle dealer and accessory manufacturers, Reads of Leytonstone, had the trademark Titan for their cafe racer body kits, so the Suzuki was known in the UK simply as the T500.

In 1969 the bike was restyled and the carbs reduced to 32mm from 34mm which gave better fuel economy. The barrels had revised porting and now had 11 fins instead of the previous 10 and new pistons were fitted. After some machines suffered piston failures, stronger pistons as used on the GT 750 were fitted.

A MK III was introduced in 1971 which had a revised tank with a luggage rack mounted on it.

Some failures of fourth and fifth gears had occurred. To overcome this gearbox oil capacity was increased in 1973 on the T500K model. The engine's bottom end was also strengthened in 1973.

GT500
In 1976 the bike was restyled and designated as the GT500 to bring it in line with the rest of the Suzuki range. The sporty GT 380 and GT550 were by now well established and the 500 was now seen as a tourer. The porting was revised and the inlet tract lengthened to produce more torque, although this reduced peak power to  @ 6,000 rpm. The larger tank from the GT 750 was fitted along with the front forks and front disc brake from the 380/550. The crankshaft was modified to take the pick-up for the electronic PEI (Pointless Energy Ignition system).

Emission regulations, especially in the US, made it difficult for two strokes to comply with the requirements and Suzuki changed its focus to four strokes, dropping the GT500 in 1978.

Racing

The T500 became popular in production racing, with Frank Whiteway winning the 500 cc Production IOM TT in 1970 and Stan Woods winning in the 1972 race.

A Grand Prix racing version of the bike was developed, the TR500. Suzuki gained its first 500 GP at the 1971 Ulster Grand Prix in the hands of Jack Findlay, who also won the 1973 Senior TT.

Technical details

Engine and transmission
The T500's engine was developed from the T20's unit. The 180° piston ported two stroke twin was of unit construction and had alloy head and alloy barrels with cast iron liners. A built-up crankshaft sat in horizontally split crankcases. To keep width down, the cylinders were rotated outward so the exhausts exited outside the frame's twin downtubes. The engine had a compression of 6.6:1.

Fuel was delivered by twin 34 mm Mikuni carburettors on the first models, but smaller 32 mm carbs were fitted from 1969 to improve fuel consumption. The engine was lubricated by Suzuki Posi Force system which injected oil to the main bearings, conrod journals and cylinder bores. Ignition was by coil and two sets of points.

Primary drive was by helical gears to a multi-plate wet clutch and five speed gearbox. The gearbox has a 'safety feature' that prevented downshifting from second to first unless the machine was stationary, although this was dropped in 1971. Chain drive took power to the rear wheel.

Cycle parts
The duplex cradle frame was stiffer than some of its competitors, leading to a reputation for good handling. Rear suspension was by swinging arm with twin shock absorbers. At the front telescopic forks were used. Brakes were drums front and rear, the front being an effective 2ls item.

References

External links

 
 
 

Road tests
 1970 Cycle World Suzuki T500 III Titan road test 
 1971 Cycle World Suzuki T500 Titan road test & 1976 MCN Suzuki GT500 road test
 1974 Motorcycle Sport Suzuki T500 road test
 1976 Suzuki GT500 road test

T500
Motorcycles introduced in 1968
Two-stroke motorcycles
Motorcycles powered by straight-twin engines